Ephrata High School may refer to:

Ephrata High School (Pennsylvania) in Ephrata, Pennsylvania.
Ephrata High School (Washington) in Ephrata, Washington.